Walt Hopkins is the former American basketball head coach for the New York Liberty of the WNBA.

Education and early career
Hopkins earned a B.A. in English writing from the University of Nevada. He then earned master's degrees from Harvard University and the University of California, Berkeley.

At Berkeley, he worked as an academic coach and tutor for the school's athletes. In 2013 he was a player development coach for the Tulsa Shock of the WNBA. He was an assistant women's basketball coach at Utah Valley University from 2013 to 2014. He joined the Minnesota Lynx as assistant coach in 2017, when the Lynx won the championship.

Later career
In 2020 under new owner Joseph Tsai, Hopkins replaced Katie Smith as the Liberty's head coach. The team will play in Tsai's Barclays Center in Brooklyn. In September 2020, he was appointed as head coach of the German women's national team. On December 6, 2021, Walt Hopkins was fired as head coach of the New York Liberty.

Coaching record

|-
| align="left" | NYL
| align="left" | 2020
| 22 || 2 || 20 ||  || align="center" | 6th in East || 0 || 0 || 0 || 
| align="center" | Missed Playoffs
|-
| align="left" | NYL
| align="left" | 2021
| 32 || 12 || 20 ||  || align="center" | 3rd in East || 1 || 0 || 1 || 
| align="center" | Lost in First Round
|- class="sortbottom"
| align="left" |Career
| || 54 || 14 || 40 ||  || || 1 || 0 || 1 ||

Notes

External links
WNBA Biography

Living people
American women's basketball coaches
New York Liberty head coaches
Minnesota Lynx coaches
Utah Valley Wolverines women's basketball coaches
University of Nevada, Reno alumni
University of California, Berkeley alumni
Harvard University alumni
1985 births
21st-century American women